Marquis de Lafayette (or Portrait of La Fayette) was painted in 1825 by Samuel Morse. Mostly known for his creation of the electric telegraph, Morse was also an artist. Morse was a Professor of Painting and Sculpture at the University of the City of New York.

Painting
Appearing to be gestural, this painting was never intended to be completely finished. It was actually a sketch for the 1826 full-length portrait of Lafayette, which was commissioned by the City of New York for Lafayette's role in the American Revolutionary War. The sketch focused on capturing a portrait of Lafayette during his brief visits to New York City from 1824–25. The majority of the painting was done in February 1825.

Morse had an unmistakable amount of respect for Lafayette remarking, "My feelings were almost too powerful for me...This is the man...who spent his youth, his fortune, and his time, to bring about (under Providence) our happy Revolution; the friend and companion of [George] Washington, terror of tyrants, the firm and consistent supporter of liberty, the man whose beloved name has rung from one end of the continent to the other, whom all flock to see, whom all delight to honor."

Provenance
Once his full-length portrait was completed, Morse had no compelling need for this sketch. He gifted it to Philip Hone (often called "The Honorable Philip Hone" by contemporaries), the Mayor of New York City. Morse likely gifted it to Hone because he was in charge of the commission. Before becoming mayor, Hone had a storied career in the auction business, from which he retired at 41. Upon retirement, he focused on forming a personal library and art collection, and was elected mayor of New York in 1826. Today Hone is known for his diaries from 1828–1851. His diary entries were incredibly detailed and historians regard them as the most extensive account of American culture in the early 1800s. Upon Hone's death, an inventory was taken of his possessions. This painting was included in that inventory ("Inventory of Paintings, Statuary, Medals, etc, the Property of the Late Philip Hone, to be sold at public auction").

William H. Osborn bought the painting at the April 28, 1852 auction of Philip Hone's property. Osborn, a railroad tycoon, was a patron of the arts, and had a personal art collection. He gifted the painting to the wealthy James Lenox in 1876. In the 1879 Lenox Library Guide to the Paintings and Sculptures, the catalogue states that the painting was "Presented by William H. Osborn, November, 1876."

Like the majority of his art collection, the painting was displayed in Lenox's newly built Lenox Library. It was listed in the 1879, 1885, and 1892 catalogues.

A few decades later the painting was donated to the New York Public Library. It was displayed in the New York Public Library and periodically loaned out to other museums.

It sold at Sotheby's as lot 1 on November 30, 2005. The Crystal Bridges Museum bought it for US$1,360,000. Since its purchase, the painting has resided in the Crystal Bridges Museum.

Related works

The full-length portrait resides in New York City Hall as a part of their City Hall Portrait Collection.

Sources

1825 paintings
American paintings
19th-century portraits
Portraits of men
Collection of the Crystal Bridges Museum of American Art
Cultural depictions of Gilbert du Motier, Marquis de Lafayette